An epitaphium is a Latin epitaph. 

Epitaphium may refer to the following works:

Music
Epitaphium (Stravinsky)
Epitaphium (Waterhouse)
Epitaphium Carpentarij, by Marc-Antoine Charpentier
Epitaphium Joannis Hunyadi, by Kodály 
Epitaphium temporum pereunti, by Bronius Kutavicius
Epitaphium Stanisław Wiechowicz in memoriam, Symphony No. 2 for choir and orchestra Krzysztof Meyer
Epitaphium – Children of the Sun, by Jeffrey Lewis

Poetry
Epitaphium Citharistriae, by Victor Plarr
Epitaphium Ansae reginae, to Ansa, Queen of the Lombards